Oh! My Part, You is a South Korean television program which aired on MBC every Saturday at 21:05 (KST), starting from April 4 to June 13, 2020.

A pilot episode was aired on January 10, 2020, at 20:30 (KST), and was hosted by Jang Sung-kyu.

Overview
It is a music inference game show where in each episode two reputable musicians (as Song Masters), with their own teams of panelists, find their singing partners among five contestants in which their real identities and singing abilities are unknown. They each seek to find the singing partners best suited for them for the perfect harmony collaboration performances, and compete which is the better one. The contestants can be of any background, and anyone can apply to be one through the show's official website.

Rules
 Usually, there is one tone-deaf contestant among the five contestants in each episode.
 First Round: The Part Song will be sung by all the contestants which are seen to be singing, but only one contestant is actually singing while the other contestants are lip-syncing. In the song performance, once the "Part Change" shows, the singing contestant will be changed to another contestant. Based on this round, the Song Masters each pick one contestant. After this round, the contestants picked will each perform a song as revelation of their identities.
 For the regular broadcast, there are two Part Songs (typically one each by the Song Masters), and after the first Part Song (First Round for the regular broadcast), the Song Master with the selection priority will choose one contestant from the five.
 After the second Part Song (Second Round for the regular broadcast), the other Song Master will choose one contestant from the remaining four.
 If one team matched the correct singing part (or colour) to the contestant chosen, the original singing voice will be played. If not, an auto-tuned voice will be played.
 Second Round (Third Round for the regular broadcast): The first round is replayed among the three contestants, the difference being both Part Songs used for the episode will be combined. Based on this round, the Song Masters each pick one contestant (the Song Master without the selection priority for the First Round will choose first). After this round, the contestants picked will each perform a song as revelation of their identities.
 Sometimes, hints to the remaining three contestants are given.
 If both Song Masters have chosen the same contestant, the contestant himself/herself will choose which Song Master he/she wants to collaborate with.
 The 1 contestant not chosen after the rounds is eliminated, but will perform a song on stage before leaving.
 The final battle will be between two teams of three singers (one Song Master and two contestants picked by the Song Master). Both teams have 30 minutes to practice their collaborations before performing. For the regular broadcast, the time given is one hour instead.
 The audience of 100 people will rate their performances, and the team with more points wins. For the regular broadcast, due to the COVID-19 pandemic in South Korea there will not be any audience. Instead, a small group forming the judge squad will decide the results.

Cast
Based on the official website.

Hosts
 Kyuhyun (Super Junior)
 Lim Hyun-ju (Assistant host)

Fixed Panel
 Park Mi-sun
 Moon Hee-joon
 
 Park Kyung (Block B)

Episodes
2020

Ratings
 Ratings listed below are the individual corner ratings of Oh! My Part, You. (Note: Individual corner ratings do not include commercial time, which regular ratings include.)
 The show will be aired in two parts. Only the higher rating of the two parts of each episode will be shown.

2020

Notes

References

MBC TV original programming
South Korean variety television shows
South Korean television shows
2020 South Korean television series debuts
2020 South Korean television series endings
Korean-language television shows
South Korean reality television series